In philately, an imprinted stamp is a stamp printed onto a piece of postal stationery such as a stamped envelope, postal card, letter sheet, letter card, aerogram or wrapper. The printing may be flat upon the surface of the paper, or embossed with a raised relief. An imprinted stamp is also known as unadhesive stamp  or indicium.

The cost of the item of stationery includes the manufacture of the item and the charge for postal service. The design of imprinted stamps often bears a close resemblance to normal adhesive stamps of the same country and era. It may be a definitive or commemorative stamp.

Collecting 
In the early days of philately, it was common to cut the imprinted stamp from the rest of the item and retain only the stamp. This is known as a cut square.  In the U.K. this is known as cut-out.  If the imprinted stamp is then trimmed around the edges, it is known as cut to shape. It is a full corner if it has the complete corner of the envelope with side and back flaps attached.  Today collectors much prefer to keep postal stationery items intact, because cutting destroys the postal history, the knife of the stamped envelope, the postmark and any receiving marks.

Usage 
Some countries permitted the use of a cut-out imprinted stamp to pay postage on another item of mail. This is also known as a cut-out.

Items of postal stationery with an imprinted stamp are sometimes found with adhesive stamps added to pay for additional services such as airmail, registration or the part transport of mail by a local postal service.  Such covers are known as conjunctive covers, and such use is known as a conjunctive use.   Placement of the adhesive stamp in addition to the imprinted stamp in order to pay a higher postal rate is called "uprated" (Spanish= franqueos complementarios).  This term also applies when an imprinted or embossed stamp is overprinted or handstamped to increase the face value.

See also 
 Embossed postage stamp

References

External links 

The British Postal Museum & Archive: First British pre-paid postcard.
1881 Canada postcard with imprinted stamp.

Philatelic terminology
Postal stationery